Campbell Chapel African Methodist Episcopal Church is a historic church and congregation in Bluffton, South Carolina.

It was built at 23 Boundary Street in 1853 by a white congregation and was acquired for use by the African Methodist Episcopal Church congregation in 1874. It was added to the National Register of Historic Places in 2019. Its National Register listing recognized its Greek Revival architectural style, reporting "structure retains much of its 19th century form and fabric".

References

African Methodist Episcopal churches in South Carolina
Churches on the National Register of Historic Places in South Carolina
Churches completed in 1853
20th-century Methodist church buildings in the United States
Churches in Beaufort County, South Carolina
National Register of Historic Places in Beaufort County, South Carolina